Lucien Emile "Lou" Conein (29 November 1919 – 3 June 1998) was a French-American citizen, noted U.S. Army officer and OSS/CIA operative. Conein is best known for his instrumental role in the November 1963 coup against Ngô Đình Diệm and Diệm's assassination by serving as Ambassador Henry Cabot Lodge Jr.'s liaison officer with the coup plotters and delivering $42,000 of the known cash disbursements.

Early life
Lucien Conein was born to Lucien Xavier Conein and Estelle Elin in Paris, France at the end of World War I. When he was five years old, his widowed mother sent him to Kansas City to live with his aunt, who had married a US soldier. Conein attended Wyandotte High School in Kansas City, Kansas, dropping out after his junior year.

In 1939, the beginning of World War II, the 20-year-old joined the French Army but switched to the U.S. Army within a year because of the German invasion establishing Vichy France. As a native speaker of French he was asked to volunteer for the Office of Strategic Services (OSS). According to biographer William J. Rust, Conein was reported to have had a "flair for exaggeration" and his service in the French Army "was sometimes portrayed as a more romantic-sounding assignment in the French Foreign Legion".

Military career

In 1944 he was ordered to help the French Resistance during the Allied landings in Normandy. He worked with the Jedburghs, a group directed by the OSS and the British Special Operations Executive.

It was then that Conein began working and living with the Corsican mafia, then called Corsican Brotherhood, an ally of the Resistance. He was quoted:
When the Sicilians put out a contract, it's usually limited to the continental United States, or maybe Canada or Mexico. But with the Corsicans, it's international. They'll go anywhere. There's an old Corsican proverb: 'If you want revenge and you act within 20 years, you're acting in haste.'

He was briefly sent to Vietnam to help organize attacks against the Japanese Army and was awarded the Bronze Star Medal for operations conducted during this period.

After 1945 during the Cold War period, he infiltrated spies and saboteurs into the Eastern European Warsaw Pact countries of the Soviet block. In 1951, the Central Intelligence Agency (CIA) tasked Conein to establish a base in Nuremberg, assisted by Ted Shackley. Later Conein worked with William King Harvey in Berlin.

In 1954, he was sent to work against the government of Ho Chi Minh in North Vietnam, at first in a propaganda campaign to persuade Southern Vietnamese not to vote for the communists and then to help with arming and training local tribesmen, called the Montagnards working under CIA station chief William Colby.

Conein was an intelligence agent in Vietnam in 1961 and 1962. Allen Ginsberg described him as "the crucial person" in the CIA's link with the Southeast Asian opium trade.

During the November 1963 coup against Ngô Đình Diệm which resulted in Diệm's assassination, he served as Henry Cabot Lodge, Jr.'s liaison officer with the coup plotters and delivered $42,000 of cash disbursements.

In 1968, Conein left the CIA and became a businessman in South Vietnam.

In 1972, President Nixon appointed Conein as chief of covert operations for the Drug Enforcement Administration (DEA).

He was considered by former CIA colleague E. Howard Hunt for the group that undertook the 1972 Watergate burglary of the Democratic National Committee. Conein told Stanley Karnow, "If I'd been involved, we'd have done it right."

Conein retired from the DEA in 1984.

Personal life 
Conein married Elyette B. Conein in 1957. They had three children. At the time of his death, he was survived by six sons, one daughter, 11 grandchildren, and one great-grandchild.

Death
Conein died of a heart attack, aged 79, at Suburban Hospital, Bethesda, Maryland in June 1998.

Note

References

Bibliography
 Hougan, Jim (1978). Spooks: The Haunting of America & the Private Use of Secret Agents.  New York: William Morrow. .

Further reading
 Fussell, James A. (Sep. 20, 1998). "Conein... Lucien Conein." Kansas City Star [Kansas City, Miss.]. pp. G3, G8.
 Rust, William J. (Dec. 2019). "CIA Operations Officer Lucien Conein: A Study in Contrasts and Controversy." Studies in Intelligence, vol. 63, no. 4. pp. 43-58. Washington, D.C.: Center for the Study of Intelligence. Central Intelligence Agency.
 Thomas, Kenny. "Lucien Conein and the Prouty Hypothesis." Steamshovel Press. umsl.edu.
 Valentine, Douglas (Mar. 8, 2003). "Will the Real Daniel Ellsberg Please Stand Up!" CounterPunch.

External links
 Lucien Conein at IMDb
Lucien Conein at Arlington National Cemetery
Lucien Conein at Encyclopedia Britannica
Lucien Conein at Military.com
 Lucein Conein at NameBase
 Lucein Conein at Spartacus Educational
Lucien Conein at Weisberg Collection
Lucien Conein's OSS Personnel File

1919 births
1998 deaths
People of the Central Intelligence Agency
CIA personnel of the Vietnam War
People of the Office of Strategic Services
French emigrants to the United States
Burials at Arlington National Cemetery
United States Army officers